Buffalo grass may refer to
 Buffalo grass, sweet vernal grass or vanilla grass (Anthoxanthum odoratum)
 Buffalo grass (Bouteloua dactyloides)
 Buffalo grass (Brachiaria mutica)
 Buffalo grass or sweet grass (Hierochloe odorata)
 Buffalo grass or St. Augustine grass (Stenotaphrum secundatum) 
 Buffalograss, another name for Guinea grass (Panicum maximum) 
 Buffalo grass or carabao grass (Paspalum conjugatum)